WCHC (88.1 FM) is the student-run radio station of College of the Holy Cross in Worcester, MA, its city of license and broadcasts at a frequency of 88.1 MHz.

WCHC's official slogan is: "Worcester's Only Alternative Source"

The station is operated by mainly student DJs who play a wide variety of music, from rock to classical and modern, including talk shows about sports, politics, and modern events.

Sports
All home games and a handful of away games of Holy Cross' Crusader sporting events, namely football, basketball, and ice hockey, are broadcast live on WCHC.

History
WCHC began operation on December 6, 1948, as a closed-circuit station, limited to the Holy Cross campus, available at 640 AM.  The College started the station as a student activity under the guidance of (Rev.) John Kelly, S.J., who often broadcast from the studios himself as "Father Pseudo".

By the 1970s WCHC had begun broadcasting as a 10-watt FM station at the frequency 89.1.

In 1988, after many years awaiting approval from the FCC, the station was granted approval to increase its output from 10 watts to 100 watts allowing it to reach most of the city of Worcester, but in order to accommodate the increased power, the station had to move to the 88.1 frequency to avoid interference with other stations in New England, particularly, the 4,000 watt WERS (Emerson College) at 88.9 in Boston.

On December 6, 2008, WCHC-FM celebrated its 60th Anniversary.

External links
Official site
Holy Cross Athletics

CHC
CHC
College of the Holy Cross
Radio stations established in 1977